The New Geneva Bridge is a truss bridge that carries the Norfolk Southern Railway across the Monongahela River between Nicholson Township and Monongahela Township, Pennsylvania. The bridge was originally built to serve the Monongahela Railroad; it has long been part of a heavily traveled coal route. At the time of construction, it was the largest bridge ever constructed using end launching. The structure is just upriver from Friendship Hill National Historic Site.

See also
List of bridges documented by the Historic American Engineering Record in Pennsylvania
List of crossings of the Monongahela River

References

External links

Bridges completed in 1912
Bridges in Fayette County, Pennsylvania
Bridges in Greene County, Pennsylvania
Bridges over the Monongahela River
Norfolk Southern Railway bridges
Railroad bridges in Pennsylvania
Historic American Engineering Record in Pennsylvania
1912 establishments in Pennsylvania
Truss bridges in the United States
Metal bridges in the United States